Dylan Peterson (born 10 February 1990) is a South African professional rugby union player who most recently played for the . He is a utility forward that can play as a flanker, number eight or lock.

Career

Golden Lions / UJ

Peterson attended King Edward VII School in Johannesburg, but did not earn any provincial selection at high school level. However, after high school, he joined the  Academy and he represented the s in the 2009 Under-19 Provincial Championship.

He also made twelve appearances for the s in the 2011 Under-21 Provincial Championship, scoring four tries including a brace against , to help the Lions reach the semi-finals, but did not play in their semi-final match as they lost 18–47 to the s.

The Golden Lions eventually went on to win the competition, beating the  42–28 in the final.

Peterson returned to Varsity Cup action in 2014 and played in all seven of their matches in the competition. However, after winning just one of their matches, UJ finished second-bottom on the log and had to play in a relegation play-off match against  to retain their Varsity Cup status. Peterson scored a try in a 42–8 victory to ensured UJ remained in the Varsity Cup for 2015. He was once again involved in their 2015 season and made six starts as they improved slightly to finish in sixth position on the log.

Pumas

Peterson joined Nelspruit-based side  during the 2015 Currie Cup Premier Division season.

References

South African rugby union players
Living people
1990 births
People from Alberton, Gauteng
Rugby union locks
Rugby union flankers
Rugby union number eights
Golden Lions players
Pumas (Currie Cup) players
Rugby union players from Gauteng